The Martinelli Building (in Portuguese: Edifício Martinelli), with 28 floors, is the first skyscraper built in Brazil. Located in São Paulo, it is 105 meters tall.

The building was planned in 1922 by the Italian-born entrepreneur, Giuseppe Martinelli. Construction began in 1924, and was completed in 1929. At the time of its opening, it was the tallest building in Latin America, and the largest concrete-framed building in the world.

The building was completely remodeled by Mayor Olavo Setúbal from 1975 to 1979. Today, the building houses the Departments of Municipal Housing and planning, companies Emurb and Cohab-SP, the headquarters of the Association of Banks of SP, and several shops on the ground floor of the building.

See also
List of tallest buildings in South America
List of tallest buildings in Brazil
List of tallest buildings in São Paulo

References

External links
 
 Official website 
 O Edifício Martinelli 

Skyscrapers in São Paulo
Buildings and structures completed in 1929
Tourist attractions in São Paulo
Skyscraper office buildings in Brazil